The Al Ali is a tribe of the Arabian Peninsula, notably in the United Arab Emirates. The tribe originally settled the island of Siniyah off Umm Al Quwain, later moving to the mainland and building a fort and defensive wall there in the late 1700s, founding the emirate (later the Trucial State and then one of the United Arab Emirates) of Umm Al Quwain.

The tribe was recorded by historian JG Lorimer as comprising 1,000 settled families in Umm Al Quwain, 200 in Sharjah and 150 in Ras Al Khaimah as well as some 140 nomadic families. The inland settlement of Falaj Al Ali was also fortified, including a trio of watchtowers (Murabbaa) which dominate the wide and fertile wadi there. This settlement later became known, after the ruling family, as Falaj Al Mualla.

References

Tribes of Arabia
Tribes of the United Arab Emirates